Sandip Maniar (born 28 December 1977) is an Indian cricketer. He played the different formats of First-class cricket, List A cricket and T20 matches for the Saurashtra cricket team from 2002 to 2013.

References

External links
 

1977 births
Living people